Tim Shaw may refer to:
 Tim Shaw (presenter) (born 1974), British radio personality and TV presenter
 Tim Shaw (American football) (born 1984), American football player
 Tim Shaw (salesperson), Australian after dinner speaker and television personality
 Tim Shaw (cricketer) (born 1959), South African cricketer
 Tim Shaw (swimmer) (born 1957), American swimmer
 Tim Shaw (comedian), American stand-up comedian and voice over actor
 Tim Shaw (sculptor) (born 1964), Northern Irish contemporary sculptor
 Timothy M. Shaw, Canadian political scientist.